Chinook station is a CTrain light rail station in Manchester, Calgary, Alberta. The station opened on May 25, 1981, as part of the original South line on the Red Line.

The station is located on the exclusive LRT right of way (adjacent to CPR ROW) at 61 Avenue SW, 5.7 km south of the City Hall Interlocking. It is a three-block walk from the Chinook Centre shopping centre. A 320-space parking facility is also available for park and ride commuters.

The station consists of a center-loading platform with ramp access on the North end.

Chinook is the only Public Transit Station named after a privately owned and operated business (the shopping mall) as there are no other landmarks or communities in the area with that title when the station opened in Calgary. Years later,  Westbrook station opened and naming scheme like this station. 

As part of Calgary Transit's plan to operate four-car trains starting by the end of 2014, all three-car stations will need to be extended. Chinook Station however was completely rebuilt to a new design very similar to Somerset-Bridlewood, McKnight/Westwinds and Saddletowne Stations. Construction on the new bus terminal started in the summer of 2012. On January 14, 2013, the station and bus terminal closed for redevelopment and has re-opened on September 3, 2013. Bus service to Chinook passed through a temporary terminal at 3 Street SW with a bus shuttle connecting the terminal and the 39th Avenue CTrain station during the station's closure. 

In 2005, the station registered an average transit of 12,400 boardings per weekday.

Connecting bus services
10 City Hall/Southcentre 23 Foothills Industrial 36 Riverbend 41 Lynnwood 47 Lakeview 66 Blackfoot Express 72 Circle Route 73 Circle Route 81 Macleod Trail 136 Riverbend 410 Glenmore Business Park

References

CTrain stations
Railway stations in Canada opened in 1981
1981 establishments in Alberta